Arthur Stewart "Butch" Paul (September 11, 1943 – March 25, 1966) was a Canadian professional ice hockey centre who played three games for the Detroit Red Wings in the 1964–65 season.

Paul was killed in a car accident in Memphis, Tennessee while driving home from a game on March 25, 1966. At the time, he was playing for the Memphis Wings of the Central Hockey League.

Career statistics

Regular season and playoffs

See also
 List of ice hockey players who died during their playing career

External links
 

1943 births
1966 deaths
Canadian ice hockey centres
Charlotte Checkers (EHL) players
Cincinnati Wings players
Detroit Red Wings players
Edmonton Oil Kings (WCHL) players
Ice hockey people from Alberta
Memphis Wings players
People from Clearwater County, Alberta
Pittsburgh Hornets players
Road incident deaths in Tennessee